Dolicharthria metasialis is a species of moth in the family Crambidae. It is found on Crete.

References

Moths described in 1916
Spilomelinae
Moths of Europe